Myra DuBois is a stage persona portrayed by Gareth Joyner, a stand-up comedian and drag performer from Rotherham based in London.

Early life
Gareth Joyner began performing as Myra DuBois in burlesque clubs and gay bars after moving to London in 2008.

When interviewed in character as Myra DuBois, the performer has described having a "past life as a bingo caller".

Career
In 2020, DuBois was a semi-finalist on Britain's Got Talent. When her audition first aired, Boy George remarked on Twitter "Love the hilarious drag queen", while Piers Morgan described her performance as "diabolical".

DuBois has been a guest on The John Bishop Show, a panellist on Big Brother’s Bit on the Side, and appeared on Dom Jolly’s Fool Britannia. She made a guest appearance in the film adaptation of Everybody's Talking About Jamie. In 2021, DuBois played Lady Von Fistenberg in the "Dragatha Christie murder-mystery" play Death Drop along with starring in her solo performance Dead Funny at the Edinburgh Festival Fringe.

Filmography

Film

Television

Theatre

References 

Living people
English drag queens
People from Rotherham
Britain's Got Talent contestants
Year of birth missing (living people)